Henning Johannes "Henry" Dafel (8 January 1889 in Pretoria – 21 August 1947) was a South African athlete who competed in the 1920 Summer Olympics.

He competed for South Africa in the 1920 Games held in Antwerp, Belgium in the 4x400 metre relay where he won the silver medal with his teammates Clarence Oldfield, Jack Oosterlaak and Bevil Rudd. They completed the race in a time of 3 minutes and 23 seconds flat. Dafel also finished sixth in the 400 metres event. In the 800 metres competition he was eliminated in the semi-finals and as member of the South African relay team he was eliminated in the first round of the 4x100 metre relay.

References

External links
 

1889 births
1947 deaths
Sportspeople from Pretoria
South African Republic people
South African male sprinters
Olympic silver medalists for South Africa
Athletes (track and field) at the 1920 Summer Olympics
Olympic athletes of South Africa
Medalists at the 1920 Summer Olympics
Afrikaner people